Bir Bikram 2 is a 2019 Nepali romantic comedy film. The film was directed by Milan Chams, written by Pradeep Bhardwaj who is the top paid screen writer of nepalese film industry ,produced by Milan Chams, and executive produced by Arpan Sapkota under the banner of Chams Entertainment. The film stars Paul Shah, Barsha Siwakoti, Najir Hussain, Buddhi Tamang, and Desh Bhakta Khanal. Bir Bikram 2 is a sequel to the 2016 film Bir Bikram, and received mixed reviews from the critics but met with positive response from audience. The film was success in single screens but had a poor run in multiplexes giving it a box office verdict of Below Average.

Plot 
Two best friends, Bir (Paul Shah) and Bikram (Najir Hussain), fall in love with the same girl, Badal (Barsha Siwakoti). She falls in love with Bir. Then Baag Bahadur (Buddhi Tamang) also falls for Badal. He breaks the two best friends apart and kidnaps Badal. Bir and Bikram swear to get Badal back, and eventually do but at a cost, Bikram dies as he prevents his two friends from killing each other. In the end, she forgives Baag Bahadur for kidnapping her.

Cast 
 Paul Shah as Bir
 Barsha Siwakoti as Badal
 Najir Hussain as Bikram
 Buddhi Tamang as Baag Bahadur
 Desh Bhakta Khanal

Reception 
Abhimanyu Dixit of The Kathmandu Post said the film was sexist, writing, "Even in Bir Bikram 2, both the male leads take sneaky pictures of Barsha Siwakoti's character without her knowledge. Is this acceptable behaviour? In one scene, a character blatantly says "Budi ko fariya ho ra chyatna lai?" (Am I your wife's skirt to tear?). How's that not sexist?" This review received mix response from Nepali audience.

Rupak Risal of Moviemanu gave the movie 3 out 5 stars . He praised some performances especially that of Najir Hussain and music while he also wrote " The entire climax could have been shortened to sharpen the final act. Controlled performances from all, however, Buddhi Tamang is overly dramatic at the beginning. His performance is much more convincing in the second half. Overall, movie is a good one time watch."

Pranesh Gautam, a comedian, produced a review of the film, calling it "unnecessarily loud" and noting that "the story is strikingly similar to the Bollywood hit Sholay (1975), and the film has nothing new to offer". He also used weapons in his review video which also received backlash from audience. He was arrested and detained for nine days after a first information report was filed by the director, Milan Chams, who accused Gautam of "defamation, libel, expressing sexist, racial remarks through social media while reviewing the movie" and of cyber crime. Gautam was arrested under the Cyber Crime Act. This caused an outcry among Nepali youths while some section also criticised for use of over the top tone and antics and use of some words. Gautam was released after nine days in jail.

Soundtrack

References

External links 

 

Nepalese romantic comedy films
Films about friendship